Bardmoor is a census-designated place (CDP) in Pinellas County, Florida, United States. The population was 9,732 at the 2010 census.

Geography
Bardmoor is located at  (27.8561, -82.7532). It lies between the cities of Pinellas Park and Seminole, with Pinellas Park to the east and Seminole to the southwest.

Demographics

References

Unincorporated communities in Pinellas County, Florida
Census-designated places in Pinellas County, Florida
Census-designated places in Florida
Unincorporated communities in Florida